Charles Norman, also known as Charlie Norman ( Karl-Erik Albert Norman; 4October 192012August 2005), was a Swedish musician and entertainer. Norman is regarded as Sweden's leading boogie-woogie piano player in the 1940s, but an accomplished all-round pianist. 

He collaborated with other artists such as Alice Babs and Sickan Carlsson. He wrote scores for a number of films and also starred as an actor in several. His boogie-woogie version of Edvard Grieg's Anitra's Dance earned him some notoriety in Norway.

Early life 
Born in Ludvika, central Sweden, Norman became interested in music at an early age and played the trumpet in his school orchestra. At the time, he was also studying the piano. Norman's parents did not want him to take up a career as a musician without first learning, what they considered, a more a proper trade. To please his parents, he began work as a lathe operator at ASEA. In his spare time he started a dance orchestra where he played the piano. His dance orchestra entered a competition in Borlänge in 1937. Norman's prowess as a pianist was recognized and he was invited to join the Sven Fors Orchestra.

Norman got his first professional job as a musician in the summer of 1937, with the Sven Fors Orchestra at the Societetsrestaurangen ("High Society Restaurant") in Varberg. He made his radio debut in 1938. After that, he worked with orchestra leaders such as Håkan von Eichwald and Seymour Österwall. In 1942, Norman contracted tuberculosis and had to be hospitalized for an extended period of time. While in hospital, Norman began to write arrangements for recording sessions and also prepared a correspondence course in arrangement for dance orchestras.

In 1949, he married Dagny Knutsson. They had a son Lennie and a daughter Lena.

Career 
At the beginning of 1940, Norman was already a skilled boogie-woogie pianist and this musical genre became the most popular of his compositions and it also became his signature. The boogie-woogie style he played in was a success when his first record, Charlies Boogie, was released in 1941.

When Norman re-arranged Edvard Grieg's classical "Anitras Dance" and renamed it "Anitras Dance Boogie" in 1949, it resulted in a major controversy. The Grieg Foundation in Norway were outraged and said that the performance "violated Grieg's artistic copyright" and his record company, Metronome, was forced to withdraw the remaining copies. By then the record had already sold in excess of 10,000 copies and the "Anitras Dance Boogie" became one of the most requested pieces in Norman's repertoire.

During the 1940s, Norman made several appearances abroad, including his television debut in Paris in 1947, on a program that also featured the legendary Édith Piaf. In 1949, Norman put together an orchestra to entertain US military personnel at the officer's club in Frankfurt. Starting in 1950, Norman reached a larger audience through his radio shows. He hosted the radio series the Nattugglan (The Night Owl) followed by The Charlie Norman Show and Charlie In School. In 1951, Norman formed a trio with Rolf Berg and Hasse Burman that toured and performed at a number of venues.

Norman made many recordings with Swedish singer Alice Babs and one of these resulted in Sweden's first gold record. His collaboration with Babs became successful and lasted for years. In 1990, Norman successfully persuaded her to make a comeback after her lengthy retirement to Spain. Norman was one of the artists in the popular radio program Dagens Revy (Today's Revue) along with Gösta Bernhard, Sickan Carlsson and Stig Järrel. In television, Norman contributed to children's programs and the family program Small Town. He wrote many film scores, for both short films and full-length features such as The Pot Travel, You've made your bed... and Dangerous Freedom. He also wrote the score for the American television series, Foreign Intrigue of which 50 episodes were shown in Sweden.

In addition to being a skilled pianist, Norman also had an excellent sense of humour and he has often been compared to Victor Borge. He wrote most of the material he used in shows. During the 1970s and 1980s Norman teamed up with his son, comedian Lennie Norman and Ronnie Gardiner for ten winter seasons on the Canary Islands where they entertained Swedish tourists. Norman also appeared in restaurant shows at the Berns and Bacchi Wapen restaurants in Stockholm, the restaurant Trädgårn in Gothenburg and Kronprinsen in Malmö. In the 1990s, Norman often played with Robert Wells, a great admirer of Norman's.

Death 
Norman died on 12August 2005, in Danderyd, Sweden from skeletal cancer.

Awards 
 SKAP stipend, 1966
 Fred Winter stipend, 1993
 Lisebergsapplåden, 1997
 Grammis Honorary Award, 1997
 H. M. The King's Medal, 8th size with blue ribbon, 28January 1998

Discography 
1941 – Charlies Boogie
1959 - Trudy (EP, Norway) (as "Charlie Norman Quartet")
1965 – Charlie Norman Show
1968 – Charlie Norman Show på Berns – Banne mej!
1970 – Charlie...
1973 – Garner och hemvävt
1975 – Charlie live
1976 – En glad X-Mas
1979 – The Boogie Woogie Touch
1980 – Charlie Norman går på party
1980 - Charlie Norman hyllar Fats Waller
1981 - Sophisticated Lady
1988 - Charlie Norman Trio
1991 - Charlie Norman Vs Robert Wells
1993 - Papa Piano
1998 - Swingtime Again
2001 – 1 timme, 12 minuter & 24 sekunder
2003 – En salig röra

Filmography 
Films Norman participated in:

Composer 
1948 – Kvinnan gör mig galen
1950 – The Saucepan Journey
1951 – A Ghost on Holiday
1952 – Han glömde henne aldrig
1952 – The Green Lift 
1952 – Farlig kurva
1952 – Sabotage
1953 – Arbetets melodi
1954 – The Vicious Breed 
1955 – The Dance Hall
1956 – Foreign Intrigue
1957 – Som man bäddar...

Actor 
1941 – Söderpojkar
1941 – Gatans serenad
1941 – Bara en kvinna
1949 – Kvinnan som försvann
1950 – Toner från Texas
1952 – Skivscheiken Nr 1
1952 – Drömsemester
1953 – Skivscheiken Nr 2
1953 – Kungen av Dalarna
1953 – Arbetets melodi
1954 – 1900 - till idag
1955 – Släck av!
1956 – Johan på Snippen
1964 – Tre dar på luffen

Bibliography 
Musikant med brutet gehör ("Musician with broken pitch") (memoirs), 1980

References

External links 
History of jazz - Video of Charlie Norman playing the piano and talking about jazz

1920 births
2005 deaths
Deaths from cancer in Sweden
Swedish pianists
Artists from Dalarna
20th-century pianists